Yongan District is a coastal suburban district of Kaohsiung City in southern Taiwan.

History
After the handover of Taiwan from Japan to the Republic of China in 1945, Yong'an was organized as a rural township of Kaohsiung County. On 25 December 2010, Kaohsiung County was merged with Kaohsiung City and Yong'an was upgraded to a district of the city.

Administrative divisions
The district consists of Yongan, Yonghua, Xingang, Yantian, Baoning and Weixin Village.

Politics
The district is part of Kaohsiung City Constituency II electoral district for Legislative Yuan.

Tourist attractions
 Old House of Huang Family
 Yongan Yong'an Temple (永安宮)

Infrastructure
 Hsinta Power Plant
 Yongan LNG Terminal

See also
 Kaohsiung

References

External links

 

Districts of Kaohsiung